This is a list of countries by the number of household. The list includes households occupying housing units and excludes persons living inside collective living quarters, such as hotels, rooming houses and other lodging houses, institutions and camps.

References

Households